25 Avon Street is a historic house, and is significant as one of the more elaborate Queen Anne Victorian houses in the town of Wakefield, Massachusetts.

Description and history 
The -story wood-frame house was built c. 1889, and has a combination of Queen Anne and Shingle Style features. Shingled elements include window bays, both projecting and recessed, while the porches are decorated with a clear Queen Anne flair, including arched openings and a floral design in the gable end of the front porch.

The house was listed on the National Register of Historic Places on July 6, 1989.

See also
National Register of Historic Places listings in Wakefield, Massachusetts
National Register of Historic Places listings in Middlesex County, Massachusetts

References

Houses in Wakefield, Massachusetts
Houses on the National Register of Historic Places in Wakefield, Massachusetts
Queen Anne architecture in Massachusetts
Houses completed in 1889
Shingle Style houses
Shingle Style architecture in Massachusetts